Adriano Banchieri (Bologna, 3 September 1568 – Bologna, 1634) was an Italian composer, music theorist, organist and poet of the late Renaissance and early Baroque eras.  He founded the Accademia dei Floridi in Bologna.

Biography
He was born and died in Bologna (then in the Papal States).  In 1587 he became a monk of the Benedictine order, taking his vows in 1590, and changing his name to Adriano (from Tommaso). One of his teachers at the monastery was Gioseffo Guami, who had a strong influence on his style.

Like Orazio Vecchi he was interested in converting the madrigal to dramatic purposes. Specifically, he was one of the developers of a form called "madrigal comedy" — unstaged but dramatic collections of madrigals which, when sung consecutively, told a story.  Formerly, madrigal comedy was considered to be one of the important precursors to opera, but most music scholars now see it as a separate development, part of a general interest in Italy at the time in creating musico-dramatic forms.  In addition, he was an important composer of canzonettas, a lighter and hugely popular alternative to the madrigal in the late 16th century.

Banchieri disapproved of the monodists with all their revolutionary harmonic tendencies, about which he expressed himself vigorously in his Moderna Practica Musicale (1613), while systematizing the legitimate use of the monodic art of figured bass.

In several editions beginning in 1605 (reprinted at least six times before 1638), Banchieri published a series of organ works entitled l'Organo suonarino.

Banchieri's last publication was the Trattenimenti da villa of 1630. According to Martha Farahat he wrote five madrigal comedies between 1598 and 1628 with "plot and character development", starting with La pazzia senile of 1598, the last of them La saviezza giovenile.

Works

Secular vocal works
 Primo libro di Madrigali a 4 voci (Milano, 1597)
 6 Libri di canzonette a 3 voci 
 I Libro:  (Venezia, 1597) 
 II Libro:  (Venezia, 1598) 
 III Libro:  (Milano, 1600) 
 IV Libro:  (Venezia, 1601) 
 V Libro:  Op.15 (Milano, 1607); republished as (Venezia, 1628) 
 VI Libro:  (Venezia, 1614)
  (Milano, 1604), first book of madrigals for five voices
 , Op.12 (Libro II madrigali a 5 voci, Venezia, 1605)
 , Op. 18 (Libro III madrigali a 5 voci, Venezia, 1608)
 , Op. 44 (Libro V madrigali a 5 voci, Venezia, 1622)
  (Bologna, 1625)
 , Op. 49 (Venezia, 1626)
  (Bologna, 1628)
  (Libro VI madrigali a 5 voci, Venezia, 1630)

Sacred vocal works
 Vezzo di perle musicali a 2 voci Op 23 (Bologna 1610)
 Nuovi pensieri ecclesiastici...
 Libro III Op 35 (1613)

References in modern culture
In 2008, a group of four composers including Lorenzo Ferrero and Bryan Johanson wrote a collaborative composition for organ and orchestra entitled Variazioni su un tema di Banchieri, which was first performed in Bologna on August 2 of that same year.

Media

References

Sources
 Cinzia Zotti, Le Sourire du moine: Adriano Banchieri da Bologna; Musicien, homme de lettres, pédagogue, équilibriste sur le fil des querelles du Seicento, Serre Éditeur, Nice, 2008.

External links

 
 Adriano Banchieri, biographie de Cinzia Zotti.www.noblessedelasne.org

 Contraponto bestiale alla mente (PDF - original version at classicaland.com)
 Original texts of Bertoldino and Caccasenno

Italian male classical composers
Italian Baroque composers
Italian music theorists
Musicians from Bologna
Renaissance composers
Italian classical organists
Male classical organists
Composers for pipe organ
1568 births
1634 deaths
17th-century Italian composers
17th-century male musicians